Lawrence Brittain (born 9 November 1990) is a South African rower. He competed in the men's coxless pair event at the 2016 Summer Olympics. He won the silver medal along with partner Shaun Keeling. Brittain beat cancer in 2015. He competed in the men's four at the 2020 Summer Olympics.

References

External links
 

1990 births
Living people
South African male rowers
Olympic rowers of South Africa
Rowers at the 2016 Summer Olympics
Medalists at the 2016 Summer Olympics
Olympic silver medalists for South Africa
Olympic medalists in rowing
Rowers at the 2020 Summer Olympics
Sportspeople from Pretoria
21st-century South African people